The Durham Regiment was an infantry regiment of the Non-Permanent Active Militia of the Canadian Militia (now the Canadian Army). In 1936, the regiment was Amalgamated with The Northumberland Regiment to form The Midland Regiment (which now forms part of The Hastings and Prince Edward Regiment).

Lineage

The Durham Regiment 
 Originated on 16 November 1866, in Port Hope, Ontario, as the 46th East Durham Battalion of Infantry
 Redesignated on 1 August 1897, as the 46th Durham Battalion of Infantry
 Redesignated on 8 May 1900, as the 46th Durham Regiment
 Redesignated on 12 March 1920, as The Durham Regiment
 Amalgamated on 15 December 1936, with The Northumberland Regiment and Redesignated as The Midland Regiment (Northumberland and Durham)

Perpetuations 
 136th (Durham) Battalion, CEF

History

Early History 
With the passing of the Militia Act of 1855, the first of a number of newly raised independent militia companies were established in and around the Durham County region of Canada West (now the Province of Ontario).

On 16 November 1866, the 46th East Durham Battalion of Infantry was authorized for service by the regimentation of five of these previously authorized independent militia rifle, infantry and artillery companies. Its Regimental Headquarters was located at Port Hope and had companies at Port Hope, Millbrook, Springville, Lifford and Janetville, Ontario.

The North West Rebellion 
On 10 April 1885, the 46th East Durham Battalion of Infantry mobilized 2 companies for active service with The Midland Battalion where it served in the Alberta Column of the North West Field Force. On 24 July 1885, the company was removed from active service.

The South African War & Early 1900s 
During the South African War, the 46th Durham Battalion contributed volunteers for the Canadian Contingents serving overseas. One member, Captain William Peter Keith Milligan who had resigned his officer's commission in order to serve overseas, was killed in action while serving with the 2nd Canadian Mounted Rifles.

On 8 May 1900, the 46th Durham Battalion of Infantry was Redesignated as the 46th Durham Regiment.

The Great War 
On 22 December 1915, the 136th (Durham) Battalion, CEF was authorized for service and on 25 September 1916, the battalion embarked for Great Britain. After its arrival in the UK, on 6 October 1916, the battalion's personnel were absorbed by the 39th Reserve Battalion, CEF to provide reinforcements to the Canadian Corps in the field. On 22 May 1917, the 136th Battalion, CEF was disbanded.

1920s-1930s 
On 15 March 1920, as a result of the Otter Commission and the following post-war reorganization of the militia, the 46th Durham Regiment was Redesignated as The Durham Regiment and was reorganized with 2 battalions (1 of them a paper-only reserve battalion) to perpetuate the assigned war-raised battalions of the Canadian Expeditionary Force.

As a result of the 1936 Canadian Militia Reorganization, on 15 December 1936, The Durham Regiment was Amalgamated with The Northumberland Regiment to form The Midland Regiment (Northumberland and Durham).

Organization

46th East Durham Battalion of Infantry (16 November 1866) 
 No. 1 Company (Port Hope, Ontario) (first raised on 8 June 1866 as the Port Hope Battery Garrison Artillery)
 No. 2 Company (Port Hope, Ontario) (first raised on 22 January 1862 as the Port Hope Volunteer Militia Rifle Company)
 No. 3 Company (Port Hope, Ontario) (first raised on 17 October 1862 as the Port Hope Volunteer Militia Company of Infantry)
 No. 4 Company (Millbrook, Ontario) (first raised on 16 January 1863 as the Millbrook Volunteer Militia Company of Infantry)
 No. 5 Company (Springville, Ontario) (first raised on 17 August 1866 as the Springville Infantry Company)
 No. 6 Company (Lifford, Ontario)

The Durham Regiment (February 15, 1921) 
 1st Battalion (perpetuating the 136th Battalion, CEF)
 2nd (Reserve) Battalion

Battle honours

North-West Rebellion 
 North West Canada, 1885

Great War 
 Arras, 1917

Notable members 
 Lieutenant-Colonel The Honourable Arthur Trefusis Heneage Williams
 Lieutenant-Colonel Henry Alfred Ward
 Lieutenant-Colonel Charles Arkoll Boulton

References 

Former infantry regiments of Canada
Midland Regiment